Raymond Zacharie Bourque (September 11, 1917 – May 31, 1998) was a Canadian politician. He represented the electoral district of Yarmouth in the Nova Scotia House of Assembly from 1953 to 1956. He was a member of the Progressive Conservative Party of Nova Scotia.

Bourque was born in Sluice Point, Nova Scotia, the son of Antoine and Marie Rose (Muise) Bourque. He married Bernadine Mary Belliveau in 1940. Bourque entered provincial politics in 1953 when he was elected in the dual-member Yarmouth County riding with Progressive Conservative William Heartz Brown. Both Bourque and Brown were defeated when they ran for re-election in 1956, losing to Liberals Willard O'Brien and Eric Spinney. Following his political career, Bourque moved to Ohio and was employed at the estate of Cyrus S. Eaton. Bourque died at Northfield, Ohio on May 31, 1998.

References

1917 births
1998 deaths
Progressive Conservative Association of Nova Scotia MLAs
People from Yarmouth County
People from Northfield, Ohio
Acadian people
Canadian emigrants to the United States